This is an outline of commentaries and commentators. Discussed are the salient points of Jewish, patristic, medieval, and modern commentaries on the Bible. The article includes discussion of the Targums, Mishna, and Talmuds, which are not regarded as Bible commentaries in the modern sense of the word, but which provide the foundation for later commentary. With the exception of these classical Jewish works, this article focuses on Christian Biblical commentaries; for more on Jewish Biblical commentaries, see Jewish commentaries on the Bible.

Jewish commentaries

Philo
A visitor to Alexandria at the time when Christ was preaching in Galilee would find there and in its vicinity Jews using the Septuagint as their Bible, and could enter their Great Synagogue. Whoever had not seen it was not supposed to have beheld the glory of Israel. The members of their Sanhedrin, according to Sukkah, were seated on seventy-one golden thrones valued at tens of thousands of talents of gold; and the building was so vast that a flag had to be waved to show the people when to respond. At the head of this assembly, on the highest throne, was seated Alexander the Alabarch, the brother of Philo.

Philo himself was a man of wealth and learning, who mingled with all classes of men and frequented the theatre and the great library. Equally at home in the Septuagint and the Greek classics, he was struck and perplexed by the many beautiful and noble thoughts contained in the latter, which could bear comparison with many passages of the Bible. As this difficulty must have frequently presented itself to the minds of his coreligionists, he endeavoured to meet it by saying that all that was great in Socrates, Plato, etc. originated with Moses. He set about reconciling Pagan philosophy with the Old Testament, and for this purpose he made extensive use of the allegorical method of interpretation. He taught that many passages of the Pentateuch were not intended to be taken literally. In fact, he said that they were literally false, but allegorically true.

He did not make the distinction between natural and revealed religion. For example, Pagan systems may have natural religion highly developed, but, from a Judeo-Christian point of view, with much concomitant error. His exegesis served to tide over the difficulty for the time amongst the Hellenistic Jews, and had great influence on Origen of Alexandria and other Alexandrian Christian writers.

Targums

Farrar, in his "Life of Christ", says that it has been suggested that when Christ visited the Temple, at twelve years of age, there may have been present among the doctors Jonathan ben Uzziel, once thought the author of the Yonathan Targum, and the venerable teachers Hillel and Shammai, the handers-on of the Mishna. The Targums (the most famous of which is that on the Pentateuch erroneously attributed to Onkelos, a misnomer for Aquila, according to Abrahams) were the only approach to anything like a commentary on the Bible before the time of Christ. They were interpretative translations or paraphrases from Hebrew into Aramaic for the use of the synagogues when, after the Exile, the people had lost the knowledge of Hebrew. It is doubtful whether any of them were committed to writing before the Christian Era. They are important as indicating the character of the Hebrew text used.

Shlomo Yitzchaki (1040–1105), more commonly known as Rashi (RAbbi SHlomo Itzhaki), was a medieval French rabbi and author of a comprehensive commentary on the Talmud and commentary on the Tanakh.

Mishna and Talmuds

Hillel and Shammai were the last "pair" of several generations of "pairs" (Zugot) of teachers. These pairs were the successors of the early scribes who lived after the Exile. These teachers are said to have handed down and expanded the Oral Law, which, according to the uncritical view of many Jews, began with Moses. This Oral Law consists of legal and liturgical interpretations and applications of the Pentateuch. As no part of it was written down, it was preserved by constant repetition (Mishna). On the destruction of Jerusalem several rabbis, learned in this Law, settled at Jamnia, near the sea, twenty-eight miles west of Jerusalem. Jamnia became the headquarters of Jewish learning until AD 135, due to the Third Jewish Revolt. Then schools were opened at Sepphoris and Tiberias to the west of the Sea of Galilee. The rabbis comforted their countrymen by teaching that the study of the Law (Oral as well as Written) took the place of the sacrifices. They devoted their energies to arranging the Unwritten Torah, or Law. One of the most successful at this was Rabbi Akiba who took part in the Third Jewish Revolt of Bar Kochba, against the Romans, and lost his life (135). The work of systematization was completed and probably committed to writing by the Jewish patriarch at Tiberias, Rabbi Jehudah ha-Nasi "The Prince" (150-210). He was of noble birth, wealthy, learned, and is called by the Jews "Our Master the Saint" or simply Rabbi par excellence. The compilation made by this Rabbi is the Mishna. It is written in Mishnaic Hebrew, and consists of six great divisions or orders, each division containing, on an average, about ten tractates, each tractate being made up of several chapters. The Mishna may be said to be a compilation of Jewish traditional moral theology, liturgy, law, etc. There were other traditions not embodied in the work of Rabbi, and these are called additional Mishna.

The discussions of later generations of rabbis all centred round the text of the Mishna. Interpreters or "speakers" laboured upon it both in Jerusalem and Babylonia (until 500), and the results are comprised in the Jerusalem and Babylonian Talmuds. The word Talmud means teaching, doctrine. Each Talmud consists of two parts, the Mishna (in Hebrew), in sixty-three tractates, and an explanation of the same (Gemara), ten or twelve times as long. The explanatory portion of the Jerusalem Talmud is written in NeoWestern Aramaic and that of the Babylonian Talmud in Eastern Aramaic, which is closely allied to Syriac or Mandaic. The passages in the Gemara containing additional Mishna are, however, given in New Hebrew. Only thirty-nine tractates of the Mishna have Gemara. The Talmud, then, consists of the Mishna (traditions from 450 BC till 200 AD), together with a commentary thereon, Gemara, the latter being composed about 200-500 AD. Next to the Bible the Babylonian Talmud is the great religious book of orthodox Jews, though the Palestinian Talmud is more highly prized by modern scholars. From the year 500 till the Middle Ages the rabbis (geonim) in Babylonia and elsewhere were engaged in commenting on the Talmud and reconciling it with the Bible. A list of such commentaries is given in The Jewish Encyclopedia.

Midrashim

Simultaneously with the Mishna and Talmud there grew up a number of Midrashim, or commentaries on the Bible. some of these were legalistic, like the halakhic sections of the Talmud but the most important were of an edifying, homiletic character (Midrash Aggadah). These latter, although chronologically later, are important for the corroborative light which they throw on the language of the New Testament. The Gospel of John is seen to be steeped in early Jewish phraseology, and the words of Psalm 109 LXX Hebrew Bible 110], "The Lord said to my Lord", etc. are in one place applied to the Messiah, as they are in Gospel of Matthew  (referenced from Psalm 110:1), though Rashi following the Rabbis interpreted the words in the sense of applying them to Abraham.

Karaite commentators

Anan ben David, a prominent Babylonian Jew in the eighth century, rejected Rabbinism for the written Old Testament and became the founder of the sect known a Karaites (a word indicating their preference for the written Bible). This schism produced great energy and ability on both sides. The principal Karaite Bible commentators were Nahavendi (ninth century); Abu al-Faraj Harun (ninth century), exegete and Hebrew grammarian; Solomon ben Yerucham (tenth century); Sahal ben Mazliach (died 950), Hebrew grammarian and lexicographer; Joseph al-Bazir (died 930); Japhet ben Ali, the greatest Karaite commentator of the tenth century; and Judah Hadassi (died 1160).

Middle Ages

Saadiah of Fayûm (died 942), the most powerful writer against the Karaites, translated the Bible into Arabic and added notes. Besides commentaries on the Bible, Saadiah wrote a systematic treatise bringing revealed religion into harmony with Greek philosophy. He thus became the forerunner of Maimonides and the Catholic Schoolmen.

Solomon ben Isaac, called Rashi (born 1040) wrote very popular explanations of the Talmud and the Bible.

Tobiah ben Eliezer a Romaniote scholar and paytan in 11th century Kastoria (Greece), wrote the Leḳaḥ Ṭov or Pesiḳta Zuṭarta, a midrashic commentary on the Pentateuch and the Five Megillot.

Abraham Ibn Ezra of Toledo (died 1168) had a good knowledge of Oriental languages and wrote learned commentaries on the Old Testament. He was the first to maintain that Isaiah contains the work of two prophets.

Moses Maimonides (died 1204), the greatest Jewish scholar of the Middle Ages, of whom his coreligionists said that "from Moses to Moses there was none like Moses", wrote his "Guide to the Perplexed", which was read by St. Thomas. He was a great admirer of Aristotle, who was to him the representative of natural knowledge as the Bible was of the supernatural.

There were the two Kimchis, especially David (died 1235) of Narbonne, who was a celebrated grammarian, lexicographer, and commentator inclined to the literal sense. He was followed by Nachmanides of Catalonia (died 1270), a doctor of medicine who wrote commentaries of a cabbalistic tendency; Immanuel of Rome (born 1270); and the Karaites Aaron ben Joseph (1294), and Aaron ben Elias (fourteenth century).

Modern

Isaac Abarbanel (born Lisbon, 1437; died Venice, 1508) was a statesman and scholar. None of his predecessors came so near the modern ideal of a commentator as he did. He prefixed general introductions to each book, and was the first Jew to make extensive use of Christian commentaries. Elias Levita (died 1549) and Azarias de Rossi (died 1577) have also to be mentioned.

Moses Mendelssohn of Berlin (died 1786), a friend of Lessing, translated the Pentateuch into German. His commentaries (in Hebrew) are close, learned, critical, and acute. He had much influence, and was followed by Wessely, Jarosław, Homberg, Euchel, Friedlander, Hertz, Herxheimer, Ludwig Philippson, etc., called "Biurists", or expositors. The modern liberal school among the Jews is represented by Salomon Munk, Samuel David Luzzato, Leopold Zunz, Geiger, Julius Fürst, etc.

Rabbi Pesach Wolicki (born 1970) is a biblical scholar and commentator. His book, Cup of Salvation, also known as Cup of Salvation: A Powerful Journey Through King David's Psalms of Praise, which was published by the Center for Jewish–Christian Understanding and Cooperation (CJCUC) in 2017, is a devotional biblical commentary on Psalms 113-118 otherwise known as the Hallel.

Patristic commentaries
The history of Christian exegesis may be roughly divided into three periods: the Age of the Fathers, the Age of Catenæ and Scholia (seventh to sixteenth century), and the Age of Modern Commentaries (sixteenth to twentieth century). Most of the patristic commentaries are in the form of homilies, or discourses to the faithful, and range over the whole of Scripture. There are two schools of interpretation, that of Alexandria and that of Antioch.

Alexandrian School

The chief writers of the Alexandrian School were:
 Pantænus
 Clement of Alexandria
 Origen of Alexandria
 Dionysius of Alexandria
 Didymus the Blind
 Cyril of Alexandria
 St. Pierius.
To these may be added
 St. Ambrose, who, in a moderate degree, adopted their system

Its chief characteristic was the allegorical method. This was, doubtless, founded on passages in the Gospels and the Epistles of St. Paul, but it received a strong impulse from the writings of Alexandrian Jews, especially of Philo.

The great representative of this school was Origen (died 254). Origen was the son of Leonides of Alexandria, himself a saint and martyr. Origen became the master of many great saints and scholars, one of the most celebrated being St. Gregory Thaumaturgus; he was known as the "Adamantine" on account of his incessant application to study, writing, lecturing, and works of piety. He frequently kept seven amanuenses actively employed; it was said he became the author of 6000 works (Epiphanius, Hær., lxiv, 63); according to St. Jerome, who reduced the number to 2000 (Contra. Rufin., ii, 22), he left more writings than any man could read in a lifetime (Ep. xxxiii, ad Paulam). Besides his great labours on the Hexapla he wrote scholia, homilies, and commentaries on the Old and the New Testament. In his scholia he gave short explanations of difficult passages after the manner of his contemporaries, the annotators of the Greek classics. Most of the scholia, in which he chiefly sought the literal sense, are unfortunately lost, but it is supposed that their substance is embodied in the writings of St. John Chrysostom and other Fathers. In his other works Origen pushed the allegorical interpretation to the utmost extreme. In spite of this, however, his writings were of great value, and with the exception of St. Augustine, no writer of ancient times had such influence.

Antiochene School

The writers of the Antiochene School disliked the allegorical method, and sought almost exclusively the literal, primary, or historical sense of Holy Scripture. The principal writers of this school were
 St. Lucian
 Eusebius of Nicomedia
 Maris of Chalcedon
 Eudoxius
 Theognis of Nicaea
 Asterius
 Arius the heresiarch
 Diodorus of Antioch, Bishop of Tarsus, and his three great pupils
 Theodore of Mopsuestia
 Theodore's brother Polychronius
 St. John Chrysostom

The great representatives of this school were Diodorus, Theodore of Mopsuestia, and St. John Chrysostom. Diodorus, who died Bishop of Tarsus (394), followed the literal to the exclusion of the mystical or allegorical sense. Theodore was born at Antioch, in 347, became Bishop of Mopsuestia, and died in the communion of the Church, 429. He was a powerful thinker, but an obscure and prolix writer. He felt intense dislike for the mystical sense, and explained the Scriptures in an extremely literal and almost rationalistic manner.

His pupil, Nestorius, became the subject of the Nestorian controversy; the Nestorians translated his books into Syriac and regarded Theodore as their great "Doctor". This made Catholics suspicious of his writings, which were finally condemned after the famous controversy on The Three Chapters. Theodore's commentary on St. John's Gospel, in Syriac, was published, with a Latin translation, by a Catholic scholar, Dr. Chabot.

St. John Chrysostom, priest of Antioch, became Patriarch of Constantinople in 398. He left homilies on most of the books of the Old and the New Testament. When St. Thomas Aquinas was asked by one of his brethren whether he would not like to be the owner of Paris, so that he could dispose of it to the King of France and with the proceeds promote the good works of his order, he answered that he would prefer to be the possessor of Chrysostom's Super Matthæum. St. Isidore of Pelusium said of him that if the Apostle St. Paul could have used Attic speech he would have explained his own Epistles in the identical words of St. John Chrysostom.

Intermediate School

Other writers combined both these systems, some leaning more to the allegorical and some to the literal sense. The principal contributors were
 Isidore of Pelusium
 Theodoret
 St. Basil
 St. Gregory of Nazianzus
 St. Gregory of Nyssa
 St. Hilary of Poitiers
 Ambrosiaster
 St. Jerome
 St. Augustine
 St. Gregory the Great
 Pelagius

Jerome, besides his translations of Scripture and other works, left many commentaries, in some of which he departed from the literal meaning of the text. At times he did not always indicate when he was quoting from different authors, which according to Richard Simon accounts for his apparent discrepancies.

Medieval commentaries
The medieval writers were content to draw from the rich treasures left them by their predecessors. Their commentaries consisted, for the most part, of passages from the Church Fathers, which they connected together as in a chain, a catena.

Greek Catenists

 Procopius of Gaza (sixth century), one of the first to write a catena
 St. Maximus, Martyr (seventh century)
 St. John Damascene (eighth century)
 Olympiodorus (tenth century)
 Ecumenius (tenth century)
 Nicetas of Constantinople (eleventh century)
 Blessed Theophylactus, Archbishop in Bulgaria (eleventh century)
 Euthymius Zigabenus (twelfth century)
 writers of anonymous catenæ edited by John Antony Cramer and Cardinal Mai

Latin Catenists, Scholiasts, etc.

The principal Latin commentators of this period were the Venerable Bede, Walafrid Strabo, Anselm of Laon, Hugh of Saint-Cher, St. Thomas Aquinas, and Nicholas de Lyra.

The Venerable Bede (seventh to eighth century), a good Greek and Hebrew scholar, wrote a useful commentary on most of the books of the Old and the New Testament. It is in reality a catena of passages from Greek and Latin Fathers judiciously selected and digested.

Walafrid Strabo (ninth century), a Benedictine, was credited with the "Glossa Ordinaria" on the entire Bible. It is a brief explanation of the literal and mystical sense, based on Rabanus Maurus and other Latin writers, and was one of the most popular works during the Middle Ages, being as well known as "The Sentences" of Peter Lombard.

Anselm of Laon, professor at Paris (twelfth century), wrote the Glossa Interlinearis, so called because the explanation was inserted between the lines of the Vulgate.

Hugh of Saint-Cher (Hugo de Sancto Caro), thirteenth century), besides his pioneer Biblical concordance, composed a short commentary on the whole of the Scriptures, explaining the literal, allegorical, analogical, and moral sense of the text. His work was called Postillæ, i. e. post illa (verba textus), because the explanation followed the words of the text.

Thomas Aquinas (thirteenth century) left commentaries on Job, Psalms, Isaiah, Epistles of St. Paul, and was the author of the well-known Catena Aurea on the Gospels. This consists of quotations from over eighty Church Fathers. He throws much light on the literal sense and is most happy in illustrating difficult points by parallel passages from other parts of the Bible.

Nicholas de Lyra (thirteenth century), joined the Franciscans in 1291 and brought to the service of the Church knowledge of Hebrew and rabbinical learning. He wrote short notes or Postillæ on the entire Bible, and set forth the literal meaning with great ability, especially of the books written in Hebrew. This work was most popular, and in frequent use during the late Middle Ages, and Martin Luther was indebted to it.

A great impulse was given to exegetical studies by the Council of Vienne which decreed, in 1311, that chairs of Hebrew, Chaldean, and Arabic should be established at Paris, Oxford, Bologna, and Salamanca.

Besides the major writers already mentioned the following are some of the principal exegetes, many of them Benedictines, from patristic times till the Council of Trent:

 Cassiodorus (sixth century)
 Saint Isidore of Seville (seventh century)
 Julian of Toledo (seventh century)
 Alcuin (eighth century)
 Rabanus Maurus (ninth century)
 Druthmar (ninth century)
 Remigius of Auxerre (ninth century)
 Bruno of Würzburg, a distinguished Greek and Hebrew scholar
 St. Bruno, founder of the Carthusians (eleventh)
 Gilbert of Poitiers
 Andrew of Saint Victor (twelfth century)
 Rupert of Deutz (twelfth century)
 Alexander of Hales (thirteenth century)
 Albertus Magnus (thirteenth century)
 Paul of Burgos (fourteenth to fifteenth)
 Alphonsus Tostatus of Avila (fifteenth century)
 Ludolph of Saxony; and Dionysius the Carthusian, who wrote a commentary on the whole of the Bible
 Jacobus Faber Stapulensis (fifteenth to sixteenth centuries)
 Gagnaeus (fifteenth to sixteenth centuries)
 Erasmus and Cardinal Cajetan (sixteenth century)

Syriac commentators 

 Ishodad of Merv (fl. 850)
 Jacob Bar-Salibi (12th century)
 Gregory Bar Hebraeus (13th century)

Modern Catholic commentaries

The influx of Greek scholars into Italy after the fall of Constantinople, the Christian and anti-Christian Renaissance, the invention of printing, the controversial excitement caused by the rise of Protestantism, and the publication of polyglot Bibles by Cardinal Ximenes and others, gave renewed interest in the study of the Bible among Catholic scholars. Controversy showed them the necessity of devoting more attention to the literal meaning of the text, according to the wise principle laid down by St. Thomas in the beginning of his "Summa Theologica".

It was then that the Jesuits, founded in 1534, stepped into the front rank to counter the attacks on the Catholic Church. The Ratio Studiorum of the Jesuits made it incumbent on their professors of Scripture to acquire a mastery of Greek, Hebrew, and other Oriental languages. Alfonso Salmeron, one of the first companions of Ignatius Loyola, and the pope's theologian at the Council of Trent, was a distinguished Hebrew scholar and voluminous commentator. Bellarmine, one of the first Christians to write a Hebrew grammar, composed a valuable commentary on the Psalms, giving an exposition of the Hebrew, Septuagint, and Vulgate texts. It was published as part of Cornelius a Lapide's commentary on the whole Bible. Cornelius a Lapide, S. J. (born 1566), was a native of the Low Countries, and was well versed in Greek and Hebrew. During forty years he devoted himself to teaching and to the composition of his great work, which has been highly praised by Protestants as well as Catholics.

Juan Maldonato, a Spanish Jesuit, born 1584, wrote commentaries on Isaias, Baruch, Ezechiel, Daniel, Psalms, Proverbs, Canticles (Song of Solomon), and Ecclesiastes. His best work, however, is his Latin commentary on the Four Gospels, which is generally acknowledged to be one of the best ever written. When Maldonato was teaching at the University of Paris the hall was filled with eager students before the lecture began, and he had frequently to speak in the open air.

Great as was the merit of the work of Maldonato, it was equalled by the commentary on the Epistles by Estius (born at Gorcum, Holland, 1542), a secular priest, and superior of the College at Douai. These two works are still of the greatest help to the student.

Many other Jesuits were the authors of valuable exegetical works, e.g.:
 Francis Ribera of Castile (born 1514)
 Cardinal Toletus of Cordova (born 1532)
 Manuel de Sá (died 1596)
 Bonfrère of Dinant (born 1573)
 Mariana of Talavera (born 1537)
 Alcazar of Seville (born 1554)
 Barradius "the Apostle of Portugal"
 Sánchez of Alcalá (died 1628)
 Nicholas Serarius of Lorraine (died 1609)
 Lorinus of Avignon (born 1559)
 Tirinus of Antwerp (born 1580)
 Menochius of Pavia
 Pereira of Valencia (died 1610)
 Pineda of Seville

The Jesuits were rivalled by
 Arias Montanus (died 1598), the editor of the Antwerp Polyglot Bible
 Sixtus of Siena, O. P. (died 1569)
 Johann Wild (Ferus), O. S. F.
 Dominic Soto, O. P. (died 1560)
 Andreas Masius (died 1573)
 Jansen of Ghent (died 1576)
 Génébrard of Cluny (died 1597)
 Antonio Agelli (died 1608)
 Luke of Bruges (died 1619)
 Calasius, O. S. F. (died 1620)
 Malvenda, O. P. (died 1628)
 Jansen of Ypres
 Simeon de Muis (died 1644)
 Jean Morin, Oratorian (died 1659)
 Isaac Le Maistre (de Sacy)
 John Sylveira, Carmelite (died 1687)
 Bossuet (died 1704)
 Richard Simon, Oratorian (died 1712)
 Calmet, Benedictine, who wrote a valuable dictionary of the Bible, of which there is an English translation, and a highly-esteemed commentary on all the books of Scripture (died 1757)
 Louis de Carrières, Oratorian (died 1717)
 Piconio, Capuchin (died 1709)
 Bernard Lamy, Oratorian (died 1715)
 Pierre Guarin, O. S. B. (died 1729)
 Houbigant, Oratorian (died 1783)
 William Smits, Recollect (1770)
 Jacques Le Long, Oratorian (died 1721)
 Dominikus von Brentano (died 1797)

Nineteenth century

During the nineteenth century the following were a few of the Catholic writers on the Bible:

 John Martin Augustine Scholz
 Johann Leonhard Hug
 Johann Jahn
 Arthur-Marie Le Hir
 Joseph Franz Allioli
 Mayer
 van Essen
 Jean-Baptiste Glaire
 Daniel Bonifacius von Haneberg
 Guillaume-René Meignan
 Franz Xaver Reithmayr
 Francis Xavier Patrizi
 Valentin Loch
 August Bisping (his commentary on the New Testament styled "excellent" by Fulcran Vigouroux)
 Joseph Corluy
 Louis Claude Fillion
 Henri Lesêtre
 Trochon (Introductions and Comm. on Old and New Test., "La Sainte Bible", 27 vols.)
 Peter Schegg
 Louis Bacuez
 Francis Kenrick
 John McEvilly
 Arnauld
 Paul Schanz
 Constant Fouard
 Anthony John Maas
 Fulcran Vigouroux (works of Introduction)
 Ward
 McIntyre

Catholics have also published scientific books. There is the great Latin "Cursus" on the whole of the Bible by the Jesuit Fathers, Karl Cornely, Joseph Knabenbauer, and Franz Hummelauer. The writings of Marie-Joseph Lagrange (Les Juges), Albert Condamin (Isaïe), Theodore Calmes (Saint Jean), Albin van Hoonacker (Les Douze Petits Prophètes).

For a list of Catholic publications on the Scripture, the reader may be referred to the "Revue biblique", edited by Lagrange (Jerusalem and Paris), and the "Biblische Zeitschrift', published by Herder (Freiburg im Breisgau). For further information concerning the principal Catholic commentators see respective articles.

Twentieth century
Haydock's Catholic Bible Commentary, 1859 edition. by Rev. Fr. George Leo Haydock, following the Douay-Rheims Bible.
A Catholic Commentary on Holy Scripture 1953 edited by Bernard Orchard, Edmund F. Sutcliffe, Reginald C. Fuller, Ralph Russell, foreword by Cardinal Bernard Griffin, Archbishop of Westminster
A New Catholic Commentary on Holy Scripture (1969) Thomas Nelson Publishers 
Collegeville Bible Commentary (1989) edited by Dianne Bergant, C.S.A., Robert J. Karris, O.F.M. Liturgical Press

Jerome Biblical Commentary (1968) edited by Raymond Edward Brown, SS, Joseph A. Fitzmyer, SJ, and Roland E. Murphy (primarily Catholic authors)
New Jerome Biblical Commentary (1990) edited by Raymond Edward Brown, SS, Joseph A. Fitzmyer, SJ, and Roland E. Murphy (primarily Catholic authors)
The International Bible Commentary (1998) edited by William R. Farmer Liturgical Press

Twenty-first century 
The Navarre Bible (2004), commentary to the Revised Standard Version Catholic Edition text by the faculty of the University of Navarra.
Sacra Pagina (2008), edited by Daniel J. Harrington, SJ.
New Collegeville Bible Commentary (2015), edited by Daniel Durken, OSB.
Ignatius Catholic Study Bible Series (2017), edited by Scott Hahn and Curtis Mitch.

The Paulist Biblical Commentary (2018) edited by Joel Enrique Aguilar Chiu, Richard J. Clifford, SJ, Carol J. Dempsey, OP, Eileen M. Schuller, OSU, Thomas D. Stegman, SJ, Ronald D. Witherup, PSS.
Catholic Commentary on Sacred Scripture (2019), edited by Peter S. Williamson and Mary Healey of the Pontifical Gregorian University.
The Jerome Biblical Commentary for the Twenty-First Century (2022) edited by John J. Collins, Gina Hens-Piazza, Barbara Reid, OP, and Donald Senior, CP.

Modern Orthodox commentaries
The Explanatory Bible of Aleksandr Lopukhin and successors (1904-1913) is written by professors of Russian theological seminaries and academies. It's based on Russian Synodal Translation, its authors apply to ancient sources of the text (Masoretic Text, Septuagint, etc.). At the present time, is the only full Russian Orthodox Bible commentary on both canonical and deuterocanonical books of the Scripture. The Lopukhin Bible was republished in 1987 by Biblical Societies of Northern Europe countries.
The Orthodox Study Bible is an English-language translation and annotation of the Septuagint with references to the Masoretic Text in its Old Testament part and its New Testament part it represents the NKJV, which uses the Textus Receptus, representing 94% of Greek manuscripts. It offers commentary and other material to show the Eastern Orthodox Christian understanding of Scripture often in opposite to catholic and Protestant ideas. Additionally the OSB provides basic daily prayers, a lectionary for personal use, and reproductions of icons in its pages.

Protestant commentaries

In general

The commentaries of the first Reformers, Luther, Melanchthon, Calvin, Zwingli and their followers wrote on Holy Scripture during the 16th, 17th, and 18th centuries.

Anglicans: Lightfoot
Arminians: Grotius, van Limborch, le Clerc
Calvinists: Calvin, Drusius, de Dieu, Cappel, Samuel Bochart, Cocceius, Vitringa, John Gill
Lutherans: Luther, Gerhard, Geier, Calov (Calov Bible), S. Schmid, Michaelis, Lange, Melanchthon
Socinians: Crell, Schlichting
 English writers: Matthew Poole, Annotations (1700), 2 volumes Folio (Genesis-Isaiah 58 written by Poole; Isaiah 59–Revelations by friends), the basis of subsequent reprints); Matthew Henry, An Exposition of the Old and New Testaments(1708-1710), 5 volumes, Folio (modern editions derive from early 19th century editions); Mayer; Samuel Clark, The Old and New Testaments, with Annotations and Parallel Scriptures (1690) and Survey of the Bible; or, An Analytical Account of the Holy Scriptures... (1693); William Lowth, Commentary on the Prophets (1714-1725); William Dodd, Commentary on the Books of the Old and New Testaments (1770), 3 volumes Folio; John Wesley, Explanatory Notes Upon the New Testament (ca. 1791), 2 volumes; ; [The so-called "Reformers' Bible":] The Holy Bible, containing the Old and New Testaments, according to the Authorized Version, with short Notes by several learned and pious Reformers, as printed by Royal Authority at the time of the Reformation, with additional Notes and Dissertations, London, 1810.

During the nineteenth century:
 Joseph Priestley (1803)
 George Burder (1809)
 George D'Oyly and Richard Mant (1820)
 Adam Clarke, 8 vols., (1810-1826)
 Joseph Benson, 5 vols., (1811-1818)
 Benjamin Boothroyd (1823, Hebrew scholar)
 Thomas Scott (1822, popular)
 Bloomfield (Greek Test., with Eng. notes, 1832)
 Kuinoel (Philological Comm. on New Test., 1828)
 Hermann Olshausen (1839)
 Haevernick (1845)
 Michael Baumgarten (1859)
 Friedrich Tholuck (1843)
 Richard Chenevix Trench (Parables, Sermon on the Mount, Miracles, N. T. Syn.)
 The Speakers Commentary, edited by Frederic Charles Cook
 Henry Alford (Greek Testament, with critical and exegetical commentary, 1856)
 Franz Delitzsch (1870), Ebrard Hengstenberg (1869)
 Christopher Wordsworth (The Greek Testament, with notes, 1877)
 Johann Friedrich Karl Keil
 Charles Ellicott (Epistles of St. Paul,)
 W. J. Conybeare and J. S. Howson (St. Paul)
 Johann Peter Lange, together with Schroeder, Fay, Cassel, Bacher, Zoeckler, Moll, etc. (Old and N. Test., 1864–78)
 Thomas Lewin (St. Paul, 1878)
 H. C. G. Moule (Epistles of St. Paul)
 Beet
 Gloag; Perowne
 Joseph Barber Lightfoot (Epistles of St. Paul)
 Brooke Foss Westcott

There were many commentaries published at Cambridge, Oxford, London, etc. (see publishers' catalogues, and notices in "Expositor", "Expository Times", and "Journal of Theological Studies"). Other notable writers include:
 Frederic W. Farrar
 Andrew B. Davidson
 Andrew R. Fausset
 Alfred A. Plummer
 Robert Plumptre
 George Salmon
 Henry Barclay Swete
 F. F. Bruce
 Marcus Dods (theologian born 1834)
 Dean Stanley
 S. R. Driver
 William T. Kirkpatrick
 William Sanday
 A. T. Robinson
 Philip Schaff
 Charles Augustus Briggs
 Ezra Palmer Gould
 Cyrus Scofield

There are also the Bible dictionaries of Kitto, Smith, and Hastings. Many of these works, especially the later ones, are valuable for their scientific method, though not of equal value for their views or conclusions.

Prominent series include: 
 Concordia Commentary series
Expositor's Bible Commentary (EBC)
 Expositor's Bible Commentary (revised) (REBC)
 International Critical Commentary (ICC)
 Interpretation: A Bible Commentary for Teaching and Preaching
New Century Bible Commentaries, now out of print
 New International Commentary on the Old Testament (NICOT)
 New International Commentary on the New Testament (NICNT)
 New International Greek Testament Commentary (NIGTC)
 Pillar New Testament Commentary (PNTC)
Popular Commentary of the Bible (Paul E. Kretzmann) (4 Vols. 1921-1924)
 Tyndale Old Testament Commentaries (TOTC)
 Tyndale New Testament Commentaries (TNTC)

One-volume Commentaries:

 Jamieson-Fausset-Brown Bible Commentary (1871)
 A Commentary on the Holy Bible, edited by J. R. Dummelow (1909)
 Peake's Commentary on the Bible, edited by Arthur Samuel Peake (1919). Revised edition, edited by Matthew Black and H. H. Rowley (1962)
 The Interpreter's One-Volume Commentary on the Bible (1971)
 Harper's Bible Commentary, edited by James L. Mays (1988)
 The Oxford Bible Commentary, edited by John Barton and John Muddiman (2001)

A notable recent specialist commentary is Commentary on the New Testament Use of the Old Testament (2007), edited by G. K. Beale and D. A. Carson.

Rationalistic commentaries
The English deists included:
 Lord Herbert of Cherbury (died 1648)
 Thomas Hobbes
 Charles Blount
 John Toland
 Anthony Ashley-Cooper, 3rd Earl of Shaftesbury
 Bernard Mandeville
 Anthony Collins
 Thomas Woolston
 Matthew Tindal
 Thomas Morgan
 Thomas Chubb
 Lord Bolingbroke (died 1751)
 Peter Annet
 David Hume (died 1776), who, while admitting the existence of God, rejected the supernatural, and made attacks on different parts of the Old and the New Testament

They were opposed by these writers:

 Isaac Newton
 Cudworth
 Boyle
 Bentley
 Lesley
 John Locke
 Ibbot
 Whiston
 S. Clarke
 Thomas Sherlock
 Chandler
 Gilbert West
 George Lyttelton, 1st Baron Lyttelton
 Waterland
 Foster
 Warburton
 Leland
 Law
 Lardner
 Watt
 Butler

The opinions of the English rationalists were disseminated on the Continent by Voltaire and others. In Germany the ground was prepared by the philosophy of Wolff and the writings of his disciple Semler. The posthumous writings of Reimarus were published by Lessing between 1774-78 (The Fragments of Wolfenbüttel). Lessing pretended that the author was unknown. According to the "Fragments", Moses, Christ, and the Apostles were impostors. Lessing was vigorously attacked, especially by Goeze. Eichhorn, in his "Introduction to the Old Testament" (Leipzig 1780-83, 3 vols.), maintained that the Scriptures were genuine productions, but that, as the Jews saw the intervention of God in the most ordinary natural occurrences, the miracles should be explained naturally.

Heinrich Paulus (1761–1850), following the lead of Eichhorn, applied to the Gospels the naturalistic method of explaining miracles. G. L Bauer, Heyne (died 1812), and Creuzer denied the authenticity of the greater portion of the Pentateuch and compared it to the mythology of the Greeks and Romans. The greatest advocate of such views was de Wette (1780–1849), a pupil of Paulus. In his "Introduction to the Old Testament" (1806) he maintained that the miraculous narratives of the Old Testament were popular legends, which in the course of centuries, became transformed and transfused with the marvellous and the supernatural, and were finally committed to writing in perfectly good faith.

David Strauss (1808–74) applied this mythical explanation to the Gospels. He showed most clearly, that if with Paulus the Gospels are allowed to be authentic, the attempt to explain the miracles naturally breaks down completely. Strauss rejected the authenticity and regarded the miraculous accounts in the Gospels as naive legends, the productions of the pious imaginations of the early generations of Christians.

The views of Strauss were severely criticized by the Catholics, Kuhn, Mack, Hug, and Sepp, and by the Protestants Neander, Tholuck, Ullman, Lange, Ewald, Riggenbach, Weiss, and Keim.

The German Protestant scholar F. C. Baur originated a theory which was for a time in great vogue, but which was afterwards abandoned by the majority of critics. He held that the New Testament contains the writings of two antagonistic parties amongst the Apostles and early Christians. His principal followers were Zeller, Schwegler, Planck, Köslin, Ritsch, Hilgenfeld, Volkmar, Tobler, Keim, Hosten, some of whom, however, emancipated themselves from their master.

Besides the writers already mentioned, the following wrote in a rationalistic spirit:

 Ernesti (died 1781)
 Berthold (1822)
 the Rosenmüllers
 Crusius (1843)
 Bertheau
 Hupfeld
 Ewald
 Thenius
 Fritzsche
 Justi
 Gesenius (died 1842)
 Longerke
 Bleek
 Bunsen (1860)
 Umbreit
 Kleinert
 Knobel
 Nicolas
 Hirzel
 Kuenen
 J. C. K. von Hoffmann
 Hitzig (died 1875)
 Schulz (1869)
 B. Weiss
 Ernest Renan
 Tuch
 Heinrich A. W. Meyer (and his continuators Huther, Luneman, Dusterdieck, Brückner, etc.),
 Julius Wellhausen
 Wieseler
 Jülicher
 Beyschlag
 H. Holtzmann, and his collaborators
 Schmiedel, von Soden

Holtzmann, while practically admitting the authenticity of the Gospels, especially of St. Mark, explains away the miracles. He believes that miracles do not happen, and that the scripture are merely echoes of Old Testament miracle stories. Holtzmann was severely taken to task by several writers in the "International Critical Commentary". The activity of so many acute minds has thrown great light on the language and literature of the Bible.

Modern non aligned commentaries
Anchor Yale Bible
International Critical Commentary

See also
 Biblical hermeneutics
 Biblical studies
 Exegesis
 Hermeneutics
 Jewish commentaries on the Bible

References

External public domain Bible commentaries
With the rise of the Internet, many Public Domain or otherwise free-use Bible commentaries have become available online. Here is a list of some of the commentaries:
The Grace Commentary by Dr. Paul Ellis
Verse to Verse by Robb Moser
Notes on the New Testament by Albert Barnes
Commentaries by John Calvin
Commentaries by Adam Clarke
Exposition of the Bible by John Gill
Synopsis of the Bible by John Darby
Complete Commentary by Matthew Henry
The Popular Commentary of the Bible by Paul E. Kretzmann 
Commentary Critical and Explanatory on the Whole Bible by Robert Jamieson, A.R. Fausset, and David Brown
Commentary by William Kelly
Commentary on Galatians, at CCEL, by Luther
Robertson's Word Pictures of the New Testament
Explanatory Notes by John Wesley
Bible Commentary Forever
EasyEnglish Bible Commentaries by MissionAssist

Many public domain commentaries are now available to view or download through the Google Books Project and the Internet Archive. FreeCommentaries.com is curating a list of free commentaries from these and other sources. The Christian Classics Ethereal Library has presented a unified reference tool to access many commentaries from different traditions in their World Wide Study Bible.

With all the commentaries now available, several resources review and recommend commentaries, including Tyndale Seminary's Old Testament Reading Room and New Testament Reading Room, Challies, Best Commentaries, and Lingonier Ministries.

Further reading

 
Bible commentators
Commentaries
Biblical exegesis